Benjamin Constant Botelho de Magalhães (18 October 1836 – 22 January 1891) was a Brazilian military officer and political thinker. Primarily a positivist, influenced heavily by Auguste Comte, he was the founder of the positivist movement in Brazil (Sociedade Positivista do Brasil, Brazilian Positivist Society), and later this led to his republican views. He left the Brazilian Positivist Society because of internal disagreements, but remained an ardent pupil of Comte until the end of his life.

Benjamin Constant was born in Niterói. He had a difficult childhood and attempted suicide at the age of 12. He served in the Paraguayan War, and had a large family. He felt underpaid and unhappy as a soldier. An intellectual at heart, he was a great supporter of Comte's Religion of Humanity.

His republican views led him to found the Clube Militar (or Military Club), with Deodoro da Fonseca, in May 1887. It was based in the Praia Vermelha Military School, and, shortly before his death, helped to organize a coup to overthrew Emperor Pedro II and establish a republic.

The Brazilian town of Benjamin Constant, Amazonas, near the Amazon River and the Peruvian border, was named after him.

He was considered the founder of the Republic in the Constitution of 1891, having died earlier the same year in Rio de Janeiro, aged 54.

See also 

 Benjamin Constant (Brazilian training ship)

References

External links
Museu Casa de Benjamin Constant 

1836 births
1891 deaths
People from Niterói
Comtism